Sean Callery (born 1964) is an American musician and composer, best known for composing the music for the action/drama 24 and the Marvel adaptation Jessica Jones.  Other projects include the 2004 video game, James Bond 007: Everything or Nothing and the television series La Femme Nikita and Homeland. Most recently he composes the music for the series Designated Survivor and Bull.

Biography
Callery was born in Hartford, Connecticut and raised in Bristol, Rhode Island.  He studied at the New England Conservatory of Music, earning a degree in piano performance in 1987. In 1987, Callery moved to Los Angeles to work for New England Digital, the creators of the Synclavier synthesizer.

In 1990, he and John Farrar scored the NBC television film, A Mom for Christmas. Working as a sound designer on the series Star Trek: Deep Space Nine also earned him an Emmy nomination.  In 1996, Callery was hired to compose the underscore for the USA Network series, La Femme Nikita, which aired for five seasons between 1997 and 2001.

Callery next again collaborated with Surnow on the television series 24 from 2001 to 2010. For his work on that series, he received three Emmy Award for Outstanding Music Composition For a Series (Dramatic Underscore), in 2003, 2006 and 2010. He also won the 2007 Film & TV Music Awards for Best Score for a Dramatic Television Program and Best Television Theme for his work on the series. In addition to his work on 24, Callery scored the music to the television series Medium from 2005 to 2010, all the episodes of Shark, and composed the music for Bones beginning with its fourth season.

In 2011 he scored the music to the miniseries The Kennedys and Kiefer Sutherland's webseries The Confession. In December, 2011, he teamed up with executive producer Howard Gordon of 24 again, for the television series Homeland. In 2012, he composed the theme music for the CBS television show Elementary. In 2014, he scored the music to the ninth season of 24, 24: Live Another Day, a special event-series, after a four-year hiatus. In 2015, he scored the music to Marvel's Jessica Jones on Netflix, for which he won the 2016 Emmy for Outstanding Original Main Title Music, which brings his total Emmy wins up to four.

Discography

Film

Television

Television films

Television series

Web

Video games

External links

1964 births
Living people
American film score composers
American television composers
American male film score composers
Male television composers
Musicians from Hartford, Connecticut
New England Conservatory alumni
Video game composers
Varèse Sarabande Records artists